The Center for Governmental Research, Inc. (CGR) is a non-profit corporation delivering data support, management consulting and implementation assistance to governments, educational institutions, foundations and non-profit organizations. Headquartered in Rochester, New York, it was founded by George Eastman in 1915 as the Rochester Bureau of Municipal Research to provide research and guidance to its home city's government and community institutions. Over the decades, CGR has grown from a bureau focused on the needs of one city into an organization with broader reach. 

Today, CGR serves communities throughout the northeastern United States. Its major practice areas are government management and education, public finance and economics, health and human services, and community data and information management. It is an industry expert in working with communities on issues of municipal efficiency, economic and fiscal impact, public service delivery and local government restructuring, including evaluating the impacts of potential municipal consolidation. It served as project manager for the 2013 municipal consolidation of Princeton, New Jersey, one of the largest municipal restructurings in New Jersey in almost a century.Via Governing Magazine It also developed the voter-approved plan in Seneca Falls, New York, resulting in the largest village dissolution in New York history. Via CBS News

CGR's president and CEO is Erika Rosenberg 
Its past president and chief executive officer was Dr. Joseph Stefko.

Expertise / Practice Areas

Government and Education 
Management reviews; Operational analysis; Efficiency studies; Budget analysis; Budgetary planning; Restructuring, shared services and consolidation; Central business office design; GIS mapping; Community planning; Policy and program implementation support; Strategic planning; Service re-engineering; Police, fire and EMS studies; Emergency services planning; Program evaluation; Policy design and analysis; Public engagement and facilitation; Change management; Organizational capacity building

Public Finance and Economics 
Fiscal distress strategy; Economic impact analysis; Fiscal impact modeling; Cost-benefit analysis; Regional economic studies; Land use impact analysis; Economic development studies. CGR also offers economic development agencies a proprietary Economic Impact Analysis product that delivers targeted economic impact analysis for proposed development projects.

Health and Human Services 
Community health assessments (CHA); Public nursing home operational reviews; Public health services analysis; Veterans services analysis; Criminal justice services analysis; Child and family services analysis; Community needs assessments; Service re-engineering; Program evaluation; Policy design and analysis; Strategic planning

Nonprofits and Communities 
Community indicators tools; Vital indicators data management; Census data analysis; Civic project data support; Service gap analysis; Program evaluation; Strategic planning; Workforce development planning; Organizational capacity building. CGR also offers communities and foundations a proprietary Community Profile product that delivers targeted tracking of a region's strengths and weaknesses as a vehicle for maximizing public investments.

References

External links

Non-profit organizations based in New York (state)
Organizations based in Rochester, New York
Government research
Management consulting firms
Organizations established in 1915